Ratlam Rural Assembly constituency is one of the 230 Vidhan Sabha (Legislative Assembly) constituencies of Madhya Pradesh state in central India.  The constituency is a segment of Ratlam (Lok Sabha constituency), and it lies in Ratlam District.

Members of Vidhan Sabha
 Before 1977 : The seat did not exist. 
 1977 : Surajmal Jain (Janata Party)   
 1990 : Motilal Dave (Congress) 
 2013 : Mathuralal (BJP)

Election results

2013 Vidhan Sabha Elections
 Mathuralal (BJP) : 77,367 votes   
 Smt. Laxmi Devi Kharadi (INC) : 50,398

1977 Vidhan Sabha Elections
 Surajmal Jain (Janata Party) : 19,738 votes 
 Hariram Patidar (Congress) : 12,038

See also
 Ratlam

References

Assembly constituencies of Madhya Pradesh